Lavora Barnes is an American political executive, currently serving as the Chair of the Michigan Democratic Party. She is the first African-American woman elected to be the position and the second woman. She was elected to the position in 2019.

Early life and education 
Barnes was born in North Carolina and grew up in Virginia. She graduated from the College of William & Mary in 1987.

Career 
Before moving to Michigan, she was the Virginia press secretary for the Bill Clinton 1992 presidential campaign and later worked in his administration. 

In 2004, Barnes became a staffer in the Michigan House of Representatives. She worked the Communications director for the Michigan House Democratic Caucus three years later. She also worked as Oakland County's deputy clerk and the state director for the Barack Obama 2012 presidential campaign. In 2015, she became the Michigan Democratic Party's chief operating officer before party chair four years later. In her campaign for the state chair in 2019, she received endorsements from Brandon Dillon, Gretchen Whitmer, and state Attorney General, Dana Nessel.

References

External links
 Official Website 
 Twitter Page

African-American people in Michigan politics
College of William & Mary alumni
Living people
Michigan Democratic Party chairs
Michigan Democrats
Women in Michigan politics
Year of birth missing (living people)